Free association may refer to: 

Free association (psychology), a technique of psychoanalysis devised by Sigmund Freud
Free association (Marxism and anarchism), where there is no state, social class, authority, or private ownership of means of production
Free association, where an associated state has a relationship with a nation
Voluntary association, reflecting … 
Freedom of association, a human right
Free Association, a publication of the Japanese Anarchist Federation
The Free Association, a London-based improv comedy theatre and school

See also
David Holmes Presents The Free Association, a 2002 album by David Holmes (musician)